Culhuacan was one of the Nahuatl-speaking pre-Columbian city-states of the Valley of Mexico. According to tradition, Culhuacan was founded by the Toltecs under Mixcoatl and was the first Toltec city. The Nahuatl speakers agreed that Culhuacán was the first city to give its rulers the title of "speaker" (tlatoani). In the sixteenth century following the Spanish conquest of the Aztec Empire, Culhuacan was incorporated into colonial New Spain and called a pueblo, but in local-level documentation in Nahuatl, residents continued to use the designation altepetl for their settlement.

History 
Culhuacan was perhaps the first of the chinampa towns founded on the shores of Lake Xochimilco, with chinampas dating to 1100 C.E.

From written records there is evidence that Culhuacan survived the fall of Tollan and maintained its prestige until the mid-14th century. According to the Crónica Mexicayotl, transcribed in 1609, in 1299, Culhuacan's tlatoani, Coxcoxtli, helped the Tepanecs of Azcapotzalco, the Xochimilca and other cities expel the Mexica from Chapultepec. Coxcoxtli then gave the Mexica permission to settle in the barren land of Tizaapan, southwest of Chapultepec, and they became vassals of Culhuacan. The Mexica subsequently assimilated into Culhuacan's culture and their warriors provided mercenaries for its wars.

The Tenochtitlan tlatoani Acamapichtli was a grandson of Coxcoxtli. Nevertheless, in 1377 Azcapotzalco subdued Culhuacán in large part with Aztec troops. In 1428, the Mexica tlatoani Itzcóatl helped to overthrow Azcapotzalco's hegemony, and accepted the title "Ruler of the Culhua".

Tlahtohqueh Cōlhuahcān (Colhuacan's rulers) 

 Huehue Topiltzin Nauhyotzin 717-763
 Nonohualcatl I 763-845
 Yohuallatonac 845-904
 Quetzalacxoyatzin 904-953
 Chalchiuhtlatonac 953-985
 Totepeuh 985-1026
 Nauhyotzin II 1026-1072
 Cuauhtexpetlatzin 1072-1129
 Nonohualcatl II 1130-1150
 Achitomecatl 1151-1171
 Cuauhtlatonac 1172-1185

(Chichimeca's dynasty)

 Mallatzin 1186-1200
 Cuauhtlahtolloc (caudillaje) 1200-1235
 Chalchiuhtlatonac II 1235-1245
 Cuauhtlix 1245-1252
 Yohuallatonac Telpochtli 1252-1259
 Tziuhtecatl 1260-1269
 Xihuitltemoc 1269-1281
 Coxcoxtli 1281-1307
 Cuauhtlahtolloc (caudillaje) 1307-1323
 Huehue Acamapichtli 1323-1336
 Achitomecatl Teomecatl II 1336-1347
 Nauhyotl Teuctli Tlamacazqui (Nauhyotzin III) 1347-1413
 Acoltzin 1413-1429
 Itzcoatl 1429-1440 (Tepaneca ruler under Maxtla)
 Xilomantzin 1440-1473
 Tlatolcatzin 1473-1482
 Tezozomoctli 1482-1521

See also
Aztecs
Pueblo Culhuacán

References

Further reading

Brenner, Anita. The Influence of Technique on the  Decorative Style in the Domestic Pottery of Culhuacan, Mexico. Publicación de la Escuela Internacional de Arqueología y Etnología Americana 1931.
Cline, S.L. "Land Tenure and Land Inheritance in late Sixteenth-Century Culhuacan," in Explorations in Ethnohistory, H.R. Harvey and Hanns J. Prem, eds. Albuquerque: University of New Mexico Press 1984.
Cline, S.L. "A Legal Process at the Local Level: Estate Division in Sixteenth-Century Mexico," in Five Centuries of Law and Politics in Central Mexico, Ronald Spores and Ross Hassig, editors.  Nashville: Vanderbilt University Publications in Anthropology 1984, 30:39-53.
Cline, S.L. Colonial Culhuacan, 1580-1600: A Social History of an Aztec Town. Albuquerque: University of New Mexico Press 1986.
Gallegos, Gonzalo. "Relación Geográfica de Culhuacan," Revista Mexicana de Estudios Históricos 1(6)1927: 171-73.
Gorbea Trueba, José. "Primer libro de bautismos del ex-convento de Culhuacán, D.F." Instituto Nacional de Antropología e Historia, Boletín 6:3. n.d.
León-Portilla, Miguel. "El libro de testamentos indígenas de Culhuacán," Estudios de Cultura Náhuatl, 1976, 12:11-31.
 León-Portilla, Miguel and Sarah Cline, editors. Los Testamentos de Culhuacán: Vida y Muerte entre los Nahuas del México Central, siglo XVI. Transcripciones del náhuatl, traducciones al español e inglés. Edited with the collaboration of Juan Carlos Torres López. México: Universidad Iberoamericana  digital, open access publication 
Pohl, John M. D. 1991. Aztec, Mixtec and Zapotec Armies. Osprey.
Prem, Hanns J. "Los reyes de Tollan y Colhuacan" Estudios de cultura náhuatl volume 30, (1999) pp.23–70

Séjourné, Laurette. Culhuacan. Mexico: Instituto Nacional de Antropología e Historia, 1970.
 

External links
  
Culhuacán, Mexico is the Relación Geográfica'' map from 1580.

Altepetl
Mesoamerican cultures
Valley of Mexico
Locations in Aztec mythology
Iztapalapa